Elachanthus is a genus of Australian flowering plants in the family Asteraceae.

 Species
 Elachanthus glaber Paul G.Wilson - South Australia, Victoria
 Elachanthus pusillus F.Muell. - South Australia, Victoria, New South Wales, Western Australia

References

External links
 Atlas of Living Australia
 Plantnet New South Wales Flora Online
 Florabase Western Australian Flora

Asteraceae genera
Endemic flora of Australia
Astereae